Michael Haydn's Symphony No. 20 in C major, Perger 12, Sherman 20, MH 252, written in Salzburg in 1777, is one of the few of his symphonies to have a slow movement in a minor key, and one of his few C major symphonies to not include trumpets or timpani.

Scored for 2 oboes, 2 bassoons, 2 horns and strings, in four movements:

Allegro molto
Andante, in A minor
Menuetto e Trio, both in F major
Presto

Discography

An LP was released in 1983 on EMI by the Bournemouth Sinfonietta conducted by Harold Farberman. This was reissued on Vox Box CDX 5020. There is also a recording by the Franz Liszt Chamber Orchestra of Budapest, conducted by János Rolla, on Teldec 8.43188 (no longer available).

Notes

References
 A. Delarte, "A Quick Overview Of The Instrumental Music Of Michael Haydn" Bob's Poetry Magazine November 2006: 20 PDF
 Charles H. Sherman and T. Donley Thomas, Johann Michael Haydn (1737 - 1806), a chronological thematic catalogue of his works. Stuyvesant, New York: Pendragon Press (1993)
 C. Sherman, "Johann Michael Haydn" in The Symphony: Salzburg, Part 2 London: Garland Publishing (1982): lxviii

Symphony 20
Compositions in C major
1777 compositions